 

Agelanthus is a genus of Afrotropical plants in family Loranthaceae. They grow in trees, including Acacia and Combretum species, as hemiparasitic shrubs of varying sizes. The host plant is penetrated by a single haustorium, and the stems typically have swollen, flower-producing nodes. The flowers are often closely clustered (fascicled) with the five petals (pentamerous) fused into a tube (gamopetalous). The flower may have a swollen base and the tubes open along unilateral, V-shaped splits. The filaments remain spirally rolled inward when the flowers open, while the styles are inconspicuous, slender filaments that are somewhat thickened in the middle. Berries range from pink to orange and red in colour, and are around 1 cm in diameter.

The genus was first described by Philippe Édouard Léon Van Tieghem in 1895.

Species
It is the largest genus of the Afrotropical Loranthaceae containing some 61 species, including:

 Agelanthus atrocoronatus Polhill & Wiens
 Agelanthus bipartitus Balle ex Polhill & Wiens
 Agelanthus brunneus (Engl.) Tiegh.
 Agelanthus combreticola (Lebrun & L.Touss.) Polhill & Wiens
 Agelanthus copaiferae (Sprague) Polhill & Wiens
 Agelanthus igneus (Engl. & K.Krause) Polhill & Wiens
 Agelanthus kayseri (Meisn.) Polhill & Wiens
 Agelanthus keilii (Meisn.) Polhill & Wiens
 Agelanthus longipes (Baker & Sprague) Polhill & Wiens
 Agelanthus microphyllus Polhill & Wiens
 Agelanthus myrsinifolius (Engl. & K.Krause) Polhill & Wiens
 Agelanthus natalitius (Meisn.) Polhill & Wiens
 Agelanthus nyasicus (Baker & Sprague) Polhill & Wiens 
 Agelanthus pennatulus (Sprague) Polhill & Wiens
 Agelanthus pungu (De Wild.) Polhill & Wiens
 Agelanthus rondensis (Engl.) Polhill & Wiens
 Agelanthus tanganyikae (Engl.) Polhill & Wiens
 Agelanthus terminaliae (Engl. & Gilg) Polhill & Wiens
 Agelanthus toroensis (Sprague) Polhill & Wiens
 Agelanthus transvaalensis (Sprague) Polhill & Wiens
 Agelanthus uhehensis (Engl.) Polhill & Wiens
 Agelanthus unyorensis (Sprague) Polhill & Wiens
 Agelanthus validus Polhill & Wiens
 Agelanthus villosiflorus (Engl.) Polhill & Wiens
 Agelanthus zizyphifolius (Engl.) Polhill & Wiens

Notes

References

External links

 
Loranthaceae genera
Plants described in 1895
Taxa named by Philippe Édouard Léon Van Tieghem